The 1980 CECAFA Cup was the 8th edition of the tournament. It was held in Sudan, and was won by hosts. The matches were played between November 14–28.

Group A

Group B

Semi-finals

Third place match

Final

References
Rsssf archives

CECAFA Cup
CECAFA